Tim Holland may refer to:

 Tim Holland (backgammon) (1931–2010), backgammon world champion
 Timothy Holland, geologist
 Tim Holland (politician), Canadian Green Party candidate
 Sole (hip hop artist) (born 1977), real name Tim Holland